Caledon Township, Ontario was a historic incorporated township and is a present-day geographic township in the modern Region of Peel, Ontario, Canada. The township forms the northwest section of Caledon, Ontario.

Caledon Township was likely named by settlers, like Edward Ellis or by public voting. Many settlers had come from the area around Caledon, County Tyrone in Northern Ireland.  In 1845, the population of the Township was 1,920. There were three grist-mills and a saw-mill.

See also
List of townships in Ontario

References 

Former municipalities in Ontario
Caledon, Ontario
Former townships in Ontario